Nadezhda Roshchupkina (born 14 June 1963) is a Russian former track and field athlete who competed mainly in the 60 metres and 100 metres. She finished fourth in the 100 metres final at the 1990 European Championships, and went on to win a bronze medal in the 60 metres at the 1992 European Indoor Championships.

International competitions

References

1963 births
Living people
Russian female sprinters
Universiade medalists in athletics (track and field)
Soviet female sprinters
Universiade silver medalists for the Soviet Union